The Trenchcoat Brigade is a four-issue comic book limited series that was published in 1999 as a part of DC Comics' Vertigo imprint, featuring several mystic DC Universe characters.

The title references an offhand joke used by John Constantine in the earlier Books of Magic series to label a loose affiliation of mystics including himself, Phantom Stranger, Doctor Occult, and Mister E who share a preference for trenchcoats as their outdoor wear (Constantine was knowingly paraphrasing the title of Alfred, Lord Tennyson's famous "The Charge of the Light Brigade", about a reckless military event).

Publication history 
They first appeared together in Neil Gaiman's The Books of Magic series, in which they attempted to guide Tim Hunter through various realms of Magic in the DC Universe in order to teach him all of Magic's abilities and consequences.

The group would later re-unite in the five-issue miniseries The Names of Magic, before finally getting their own miniseries.

Members

External links

References 

1999 comics debuts
Fantasy comics
DC Comics superhero teams
Lists of DC characters by organization
The Books of Magic